Nova Maree Peris  (born 25 February 1971) is an Aboriginal  Australian athlete and former politician. As part of the Australian women's field hockey (Hockeyroos) team at the 1996 Olympic Games, she was the first Aboriginal Australian to win an Olympic gold medal.  She later switched sports to sprinting and went to the 1998 Commonwealth Games and 2000 Olympic Games. She was elected to the Australian Senate at the 2013 federal election, after then Prime Minister Julia Gillard named her as a "captain's pick", installing her as the preselected Labor candidate over incumbent Labor senator Trish Crossin.  She retired from the Senate in 2016.

Sporting career
Peris was a representative in the Australian Women's Hockey team at the 1996 Summer Olympics, becoming the first Aboriginal Australian to win an Olympic gold medal.
In 1997, she switched sports and a year later she became a double gold medalist in the 1998 Commonwealth Games (Kuala Lumpur) winning the 200m sprint with a time of 22.77 seconds and sharing in Australia's 4 × 100 metres relay win. Peris was named Young Australian of the Year in 1997.

Peris continued to represent Australia on the athletics track, running over 200 metres at the 1999 World Athletics Championships and 400 metres at the Sydney Olympics in 2000.  She made the Olympic semi-finals in her individual event and ran in the Australian 4 × 400 metres relay team, which made the final, finishing fifth.

In the Olympic year of 2000, a portrait of her was hung in the Sporting Archibald Prize, painted by Glenda Jones.

In 2005, she sold her Olympic memorabilia to the National Museum of Australia for $140,000. It included her gold medal, hockey stick, Sydney Olympic torch and the running shoes she wore in the Sydney Olympics.

Political career
On 22 January 2013 the Australian Prime Minister Julia Gillard announced she would invite Peris to join the Australian Labor Party and stand as a candidate for the Senate in the Northern Territory at the 2013 election. On 29 January 2013 her preselection was endorsed by the ALP executive 19 votes to 2, meaning her name was placed first on the ALP's senate ticket in the Northern Territory, supporting the likelihood that she would become Australia's first female Indigenous federal parliamentarian.

On 7 September 2013 Peris became Australia's first Indigenous woman elected to federal parliament. Peris was sworn into parliament on 12 November, and noted the apology to the stolen generation in her maiden speech.

Peris announced on 24 May 2016 that she would not nominate to re-contest her Senate seat at the 2016 federal election. Fairfax and the ABC reported that Peris was one of the frontrunners being considered to replace Jason Mifsud as head of diversity for the Australian Football League (AFL). Malarndirri McCarthy announced on 25 May 2016 that she had been invited by Labor to nominate herself as Peris' Senate replacement and that she would do so. Nova Peris's Senate term ended at the double dissolution of 9 May 2016.

Other roles
 Peris is an Ambassador for the Australian Indigenous Education Foundation.

Personal life 
Peris was born in Darwin, Northern Territory. Her biological father was Indigenous rights activist John Christophersen, although she had no contact with him between the ages of 2 and 16. Her mother, Joan, had been removed from her mother raised in the Catholic mission on Melville Island, as one of the Stolen Generations.

Peris met Sean Kneebone when she was 17, they had a daughter in 1990, married in 1995 and divorced in 2001. While married to Kneebone, she adopted the surname Peris-Kneebone but reverted following their divorce.

In March 2002 she married Daniel Batman; and they had two children but they separated in 2010 and Batman died in a car crash in June 2012.

Peris married Scott Appleton on 12 August 2012.

Peris has three children: Jessica (with Kneebone) and Destiny and Jack (with Batman). She became a grandmother at the age of 40.

Peris' autobiography, Nova: My Story was released on 4 April 2003.

In 2019, Peris competed in the sixth season of Australian Survivor. She was eliminated on Day 10 and finished in 21st place.

In 2020 she sued for defamation over brief comments made by Jacinta Price on the television program Studio 10.

Her son Jack is a footballer for the St. Kilda Football Club.

Controversy 
In October 2014, explicit emails between Peris and athlete Ato Boldon were leaked to the press. The emails were used as the basis for allegations that Peris had used her role as an ambassador for Athletics Australia to organise a trip to Australia for Boldon as part of the "Jump Start to London" athletics program, during which she intended to engage in an affair with the athlete. Boldon subsequently described the accusations as containing "gross fabrications" and threatened legal action. Speaking in Parliament on 30 October, Peris denied wrongdoing, and alleged that the release of the emails was part of a blackmail attempt in regard to the child custody battle.

See also
 List of Indigenous Australian politicians
 Dual sport and multi-sport Olympians

References

External links 
 
 Transcript of Nova Peris interview on Enough Rope with Andrew Denton, 31 March 2003
 
 Summary of parliamentary voting for Senator Nova Peris on TheyVoteForYou.org.au
 

1971 births
Living people
Australian female field hockey players
Olympic field hockey players of Australia
Australian female sprinters
Olympic athletes of Australia
Olympic gold medalists for Australia
Field hockey players at the 1996 Summer Olympics
Athletes (track and field) at the 2000 Summer Olympics
Athletes (track and field) at the 1998 Commonwealth Games
Indigenous Australian Olympians
Indigenous Australian track and field athletes
Indigenous Australian field hockey players
Recipients of the Medal of the Order of Australia
Recipients of the Australian Sports Medal
Commonwealth Games gold medallists for Australia
Olympic medalists in field hockey
Australian Institute of Sport field hockey players
Sportspeople from Darwin, Northern Territory
Australian sportsperson-politicians
Members of the Australian Senate
Members of the Australian Senate for the Northern Territory
Women members of the Australian Senate
Australian Labor Party members of the Parliament of Australia
Indigenous Australian politicians
Medalists at the 1996 Summer Olympics
Commonwealth Games medallists in athletics
21st-century Australian politicians
21st-century Australian women politicians
Australian Survivor contestants
Medallists at the 1998 Commonwealth Games